Melanomyza femoralis is a species of fly in the family Lauxaniidae.

References

Lauxaniidae
Articles created by Qbugbot
Taxa named by Hermann Loew
Insects described in 1861